The 2001–02 NBA season was the Mavericks' 22nd season in the National Basketball Association. It was also their first season playing at American Airlines Center. During the off-season, the Mavericks acquired All-Star point guard Tim Hardaway from the Miami Heat, and signed free agents Adrian Griffin, Johnny Newman, and Danny Manning. The Mavericks continued to play solid basketball winning ten straight games between December and January, then post a 7-game winning streak also in January as they held a 35–14 record at the All-Star break. At midseason, Hardaway was traded along with Juwan Howard to the Denver Nuggets in exchange for Nick Van Exel and Raef LaFrentz. The Mavericks finished fourth in the Western Conference, and second in the Midwest Division with a 57–25 record, and made the playoffs in back to back seasons for the first time since 1988.

Dirk Nowitzki and Steve Nash were both selected to the 2002 NBA All-Star Game for the first time in their careers, while head coach Don Nelson was voted to coach the Western Conference. Nowitzki led the team with 23.4 points and 9.9 rebounds per game, and was named to the All-NBA Second Team, while Nash averaged 17.9 points and led the team with 7.7 assists per game, and was selected to the All-NBA Third Team, and Michael Finley provided the team with 20.6 points and 5.2 rebounds per game. Nowitzki also finished in eighth place in Most Valuable Player voting, while Nash finished in fourteenth place in Most Valuable Player voting, and also finished in third place in Most Improved Player voting.

In the Western Conference First Round, the Mavericks swept the Minnesota Timberwolves in three straight games, but then lost in five games to the Sacramento Kings in the Western Conference Semi-finals. Following the season, Greg Buckner signed as a free agent with the Philadelphia 76ers, while Newman retired, and Manning was released to free agency, and signed with the Detroit Pistons midway through the next season.

For the season, the Mavericks changed their primary logo, which showed a horse in front of a blue basketball above the team name "Mavericks", and also changed their uniforms, adding dark navy blue and light blue along with grey and black to their color scheme. The home jerseys remained in use until 2014, while the road jerseys lasted until 2010. Their primary logo is still present as of 2022.

Offseason

Draft picks

Roster

Roster Notes
 Center Shawn Bradley holds both American and German citizenship.

Regular season

Season standings

z – clinched division title
y – clinched division title
x – clinched playoff spot

Record vs. opponents

Game log

Playoffs

|- align="center" bgcolor="#ccffcc"
| 1
| April 21
| @ Minnesota
| W 101–94
| Dirk Nowitzki (30)
| Dirk Nowitzki (15)
| Nick Van Exel (7)
| American Airlines Center20,010
| 1–0
|- align="center" bgcolor="#ccffcc"
| 2
| April 24
| @ Minnesota
| W 122–110
| Dirk Nowitzki (31)
| Dirk Nowitzki (15)
| Steve Nash (10)
| American Airlines Center20,084
| 2–0
|- align="center" bgcolor="#ccffcc"
| 3
| April 28
| Minnesota
| W 115–102
| Dirk Nowitzki (39)
| Dirk Nowitzki (17)
| Steve Nash (11)
| Target Center18,795
| 3–0
|-

|- align="center" bgcolor="#ffcccc"
| 1
| May 4
| @ Sacramento
| L 91–108
| Dirk Nowitzki (23)
| Dirk Nowitzki (14)
| Steve Nash (5)
| ARCO Arena17,317
| 0–1
|- align="center" bgcolor="#ccffcc"
| 2
| May 6
| @ Sacramento
| W 110–102
| Steve Nash (30)
| Dirk Nowitzki (15)
| Steve Nash (8)
| ARCO Arena17,317
| 1–1
|- align="center" bgcolor="#ffcccc"
| 3
| May 9
| Sacramento
| L 119–125
| Michael Finley (37)
| Raef LaFrentz (13)
| Steve Nash (5)
| American Airlines Center20,265
| 1–2
|- align="center" bgcolor="#ffcccc"
| 4
| May 11
| Sacramento
| L 113–115 (OT)
| Dirk Nowitzki (31)
| Dirk Nowitzki (12)
| Dirk Nowitzki (7)
| American Airlines Center20,274
| 1–3
|- align="center" bgcolor="#ffcccc"
| 5
| May 13
| @ Sacramento
| L 101–114
| Dirk Nowitzki (32)
| Dirk Nowitzki (12)
| Steve Nash (9)
| ARCO Arena17,317
| 1–4
|-

Player statistics

Season

Playoffs

Awards and records
 Dirk Nowitzki, All-NBA Second Team
 Steve Nash, All-NBA Third Team
 Dirk Nowitzki, NBA All-Star Game
 Steve Nash, NBA All-Star Game

Transactions

Trades

Free Agents

Player Transactions Citation:

References

See also
 2001–02 NBA season

Dallas Mavericks seasons
Dallas
Dallas